Ammoselinum is a genus of flowering plant in the family Apiaceae, known commonly as sandparsley. It is native to temperate North and South America.

Species:
Ammoselinum butleri (Engelm. ex S.Watson) J.M.Coult. & Rose – Butler's sandparsley   
Ammoselinum occidentale Munz & I.M.Johnst.
Ammoselinum popei orr. & A.Gray – plains sandparsley
Ammoselinum rosengurtii Mathias & Constance

References

External links 
 Jepson Manual Treatment
 USDA Plants Profile

Apioideae
Apioideae genera